Haemanota syntomoides is a moth of the family Erebidae. It is found in Suriname.

References

 

Haemanota
Moths described in 1910